Bell's Pass is a mountain pass situated in the Free State province, South Africa, on the R73 road between Winburg and Bloemfontein.

Mountain passes of the Free State (province)